COPC Inc., is a privately held management consulting company based in Winter Park, Florida that specializes in customer experience transformation. COPC Inc. provides performance-improvement consulting, training, certification, and benchmarking. Clients of COPC Inc. include  Apple, Microsoft, Sprint, HTC, Mattel, RBS, DiGi, Canal Digital, UWV, ToysRus, Datacom,  Sitel,  and Citigroup. COPC Inc. is well-known in the customer experience industry and many of the industry-associated organizations actively promote them.

According to the World Bank, "COPC standards and certifications are the fastest-growing industry-specific standards that provide compliance parameters in areas such as client satisfaction, computer infrastructure, and accuracy of responses".

History 

In 1996, the COPC Customer Experience (CX) Standard was developed by buyers, providers and senior managers responsible for operational management. The group included representatives from American Express, Compaq, Dell, Intel, L.L. Bean, Microsoft, Motorola and Novell. It is performance-centric and data-driven, using processes and people as enablers and leadership and planning as drivers. Based on the Baldrige Criteria for Performance Excellence framework, COPC Inc. combines pragmatic business sense with stringent high-performance benchmarks. With over 1500 sites across the world using it, the COPC Inc. standard is the de facto performance management system in the customer service and BPO space. Co-founders of COPC Inc. include Cliff Moore, Alton Martin and Peter Bloom.

In March 2020, COPC Inc. has reported virtualization of consultancy, training, certification and Vendor Management Organization (VMO) services in the light of recent COVID-19 events.

Standards Committee 

The current COPC Inc. Standards Committee evolved from the initial group of business professionals that formed the first edition of the COPC CX Standard, and precedes the founding of the company. The Standards Committee is made up of volunteers from organizations that implement the COPC family of standards. Standards Committee members are responsible for proposing improvements to the COPC CX Standard and promoting implementation of the COPC CX Standard. The committee meets twice annually. There are four core standards that are maintained and updated by the committee; these include:
 COPC Customer Service Provider (CSP) Standard – for internal operations
 COPC Vendor Management Organization (VMO) Standard – for vendor management organizations
 COPC Outsource Service Provider (OSP) Standard – for outsourced operations

The COPC CX Standard 

The COPC CX Standard was created by COPC Inc. to provide a benchmark for buyers of contact center services.  COPC Inc. Certification provides defined processes, measured metrics, and outcomes to highlight qualified suppliers. To become certified, COPC Inc. offers suppliers consulting services, benchmarking services, training, and installation, a process designed to help companies continually measure customer contact center performance.

Based on this performance management system COPC Inc. conducts:

 Consulting Services:
 Performance Improvement Consulting – focuses on making business better
 Strategic Sourcing Consulting – focuses on finding the right partner to work with and making these relationships work better
 Training Services – a combination of online, in-person and live virtual training, available both publicly and in dedicated sessions providing the right skills to drive continuous improvement
 Certification Services – a stringent certification process which a call center can achieve; once certified, the center has to be recertified every 2 years to ensure the quality standards are maintained and improved which is more demanding than the initial certification process.

Performance Improvement Criteria 

In 2012 COPC Inc. launched its Performance Improvement Criteria which define best practices for contact centers and BPO companies. Performance Improvement Criteria are a set of operational requirements based on the COPC Customer Service Provider (CSP) Standard. The stated importance of Performance Improvement Criteria is threefold:

Improvement: Drive improvements in customer satisfaction and cost to serve consistency of operations
Benchmarking: Comparisons with others – competitors or other industry service role models
Recognition: Convince customers, staff and/or clients of the effectiveness of the contact center

References

External links 
 

Management consulting firms of the United States